İskender Pasha Mihaloğlu (fl. 1478–1504), known simply as Skender Pasha, was the sanjakbey of the Bosnian Sanjak in period 1478–1480, 1485–1491 and 1499–1504.  A Mihaloğlu family member, descendant of Köse Mihal, he and his brother Ali Bey (the sanjakbey of Smederevo) helt notable offices in Rumelia (the Balkans).

Life

Origin
He was member of the Mihaloğlu family which descended from Köse Mihal. His brother was Ali Bey Mihaloğlu.

Career

In 1476 Skender Pasha joined up with his brother Ali Bey, the sanjakbey of Smederevo, as he departed from Smederevo and crossed the Danube ahead of 5,000 spahis making a second attempt to reach Temesvár. Ali Bey was confronted by the Hungarian nobility at Pančevo. The Ottomans suffered an utter defeat and barely escaped in a small boat. The Hungarians chased Ali Bey into the valley on the opposite bank of the Nadela where they liberated all the previously captured Hungarian prisoners and also took 250 Ottoman captives.

He was the sanjakbey of Bosnia in 1478–1480, 1485–1491 and 1499–1504.

In 1499 he captured part of the Venetian territories in Dalmatia. Around 1500 he built a tekke (Islamic religious institution) of the Naqshbandi order in Sarajevo, capital of Bosnia. In 1501 he unsuccessfully besieged Jajce and was defeated by János (Ivaniš) Corvin, assisted by Zrinski, Frankopan, Karlović and Cubor.

References

Sources 
 

Ottoman governors of Bosnia
Ottoman Bosnian nobility
15th-century people from the Ottoman Empire
16th-century people from the Ottoman Empire
1504 deaths